The Museum Society of Hadsund (Danish: Hadsund Egnssamling) is a cultural history museum in Hadsund, Denmark.  

During 1962, a museum association was established. The museum was inaugurated on October 2, 1962.
During 1967, the exhibition  moved from  Sprøtehuset to Vestergade. On October 2, 1967, the new museum was inaugurated. Since 2004 it has been part of North Jutland Historical Museum.

References

External links
Nordjyllands Historiske Museum website

Hadsund
Museums in Denmark
Museums established in 1962